Rhythmic gymnastics events have been staged at the Olympic Games since 1984. Brazilian rhythmic gymnasts have participated in six editions of the Summer Olympics. A total of 24 gymnasts have represented Brazil in individual and group events. Brazilian women have yet to win a medal at the Olympics.

Gymnasts

Individual

Group

References

Brazil
gymnasts
Olympic